Santiago Garcia Granda (born 1955 in Verdicio, Asturias), studied chemistry and graduated in 1980, and earned his PhD in 1984 at the University of Oviedo. He completed his academic training as a postdoctoral fellow at the University of Nijmegen, Holland with Professor Paul T. Beurskens. He specialised in structural determination, crystallography, diffraction and methods of calculations. He is ex-president of the European Crystallographic Association (ECA) where he has served since August 2006 and has just been elected ordinary member of the executive committee of the International Union of Crystallography.

He also teaches chemistry and bilingual Master courses, Spanish-English, at the University of Oviedo and the Menéndez Pelayo International University. He has supervised more than 18 PhD theses.

He is the author of more than 500 scientific and dissemination papers, several chapters of books and numerous communications and lectures presented in conferences on physico-chemical studies of new materials, molecular structure, crystallography, diffraction and methods of calculation. He is co-author of the crystallography programme DirDif cited more than 3000 times and he has led more than 30 research projects, both national and European, establishing contracts with firms and scientific dissemination projects. He is the head of the SYSTAM research group of the Department of Physical and Analytical Chemistry, declared Group of Excellence of the Principality of Asturias in 2001. He was responsible for the infrastructure installation in the Spanish line of the ESRF.

In 2016, he joined the elections to become rector of the University of Oviedo, and he was the winning candidate. From 2008 to April 2012 he was Vice rector for Research of the University of Oviedo, and Executive Secretary of the Sectoral R+D of the CRUE. During the 35 years he has been devoted to the University of Oviedo, he has held several positions and undertaken different academic tasks and duties.

References

Sources
 MASTER'S DEGREE IN CRYSTALLOGRAPHY AND CRYSTALLIZATION - UIMP
 Scholar Google Profile
 Profile in Researchgate.net
 Structural and optical properties of hydrothermally-synthesized single-crystalline Sb2O3 nanowires
 Chiral Triazolium Salts and Ionic Liquids: From the Molecular Design Vectors to Their Physical Properties through Specific Supramolecular Interactions - IQAC- CSIC
 Ferrer, S., Lloret, F., Bertomeu, I., Alzuet, G., Borrás, J., García-Granda, S., ... & Haasnoot, J. G. (2002). Cyclic Trinuclear and Chain of Cyclic Trinuclear Copper (II) Complexes Containing a Pyramidal  Core. Crystal Structures and Magnetic Properties of [(μ (aaat(](•[aaat = 3-Acetylamino-5-amino-1,2,4-triazolate] and {[(μ)(aat (μ)]• 6[aat = 3-Acetylamino-1,2,4-triazolate]: New Cases of Spin-Frustrated Systems. Inorganic chemistry, 41(22), 5821-5830.

External links 
 Official site of the University of Oviedo
 Official site of Researchers of the University of Oviedo

Living people
1955 births
People from Asturias